Shoals is an unincorporated community in Wayne County, West Virginia, United States. Shoals has a post office with ZIP code 25562.

The community was named for a river shoal near the original town site.

References

Unincorporated communities in Wayne County, West Virginia
Unincorporated communities in West Virginia